Justin Gimelstob and Sébastien Lareau were the defending champions, but none competed this year.

Alex O'Brien and Jared Palmer won the title by defeating Andre Agassi and Sargis Sargsian 7–5, 6–1 in the final.

Seeds
The top four seeds receive a bye into the second round.

Draw

Finals

Top half

Bottom half

External links
 Main draw (ATP)
 Qualifying draw (ATP)

2000 ATP Tour